Hacallı (also, Gadzhally and Gadzhialilu) is a village and municipality in the Goranboy Rayon of Azerbaijan.  It has a population of 683. The municipality consists of the villages of Hacallı and Şəfibəyli.

References 

Populated places in Goranboy District